Daniel Frank (January 4, 1882 – March 20, 1965) was an American athlete who competed mainly in the long jump.  He was Jewish. He competed for the United States in the 1904 Summer Olympics held in St Louis, United States in the Long Jump where he won the silver medal.

See also
 List of select Jewish track and field athletes

References

 

1882 births
1965 deaths
American male long jumpers
Olympic silver medalists for the United States in track and field
Athletes (track and field) at the 1904 Summer Olympics
Jewish male athletes (track and field)
Jewish American sportspeople
Medalists at the 1904 Summer Olympics